Screenland was a monthly U.S. magazine about movies, published between September 1920 and June 1971, when it merged with Silver Screen.  In the September 1952 issue, the name changed to Screenland plus TV-Land.

In was established in Los Angeles, California, with Myron Zobel as the editor in 1922. Frederick James Smith became the editor in 1923 when it moved to Cooperstown, New York. One magazine-collector site credits, without attribution, one Paul Hunter, "with rescuing Screenland magazine for John Cuneo back in 1932."

In October 1952, Ned Pines' Standard Magazines, an imprint of Pines Publications, purchased  Silver Screen and Screenland from the Henry Publishing company. Pines announced in June 1954 that he was suspending publication with the August 1954 issue, citing production and distribution costs. The magazine continued publication through 1971, however.

In 1923 the magazine reported a love affair between Evelyn Brent and Douglas Fairbanks, resulting in legal threats, and a retraction.

Further reading
 
 
 Screenland Magazine Inc. v. National City Bank of New York (1943)

References

External links

 , 
 April 1922
 October 1923
 April 1929
 Cover images: 1924-51
 Covers: 1921-1975

Film magazines published in the United States
Magazines established in 1920
Magazines disestablished in 1971
Defunct magazines published in the United States
Magazines published in Los Angeles
Monthly magazines published in the United States